Rafah is an important city in North Sinai and Egypt's eastern border with the Gaza Strip. It is the capital of Rafah center in North Sinai Governorate, and is situated on the eastern Mediterranean coast of Egypt.

Rafah is the site of the Rafah Border Crossing, the sole crossing point between Egypt and the Gaza Strip. The Egyptian government announced in early 2015 that it would raze the entire city and build a new settlement for its residents, in order to expand a security buffer between Egypt and Gaza Strip. The Egyptian military reportedly began bulldozing sections of Rafah in late 2014.

History

When Israel withdrew from the Sinai in 1982, Rafah was split into a Gazan part and an Egyptian part, dividing families, separated by barbed-wire barriers. The core of the city was destroyed by Israel and Egypt to create a large buffer zone.

During the 2011 Egyptian protests, anti-government rioters attacked and killed three police officers in the town.

In October 2014, the Egyptian government announced plans to relocate the population and completely demolish the city in order to enlarge the buffer zone between Egypt and Gaza. Between July 2013 and August 2015, Egyptian authorities demolished at least 3,255 residential, commercial, administrative, and community buildings along the border, forcibly evicting thousands of people.

In June 2015 Egypt completed the digging of a ditch at the Rafah Crossing Point, 20 meters wide by 10 meters deep. It is located two kilometers from the border with Gaza outside of Rafah City and part of the enlarged buffer zone. Expansion of the trench along with watchtowers was planned.
In November 2021, Egypt and Israel signed an agreement that allows Egypt to increase its military presence in Rafah.

Economy
Rafah is in a Mediterranean climate zone and agriculture thrives. Due to rain, hail and sleet; the city has plentiful sources of water for agriculture. Mediterranean fruits and crops are dominant, such as: peaches, olives, apples, citrus fruits, dates, grapes, vegetables, strawberries and peppers.

Smuggling to the Gaza Strip has been a major source of income for Bedouin tribesmen, using over 1,200 smuggling tunnels to smuggle food, weapons and other goods into Gaza.

Climate
Like east Mediterranean cities and Egypt's north coast but wetter, it is characterised by hot dry summers and mild rainy winters. The temperature during summer can be around  during daytime, and rarely exceeds  due to the influence of the sea. Winters range from mild to cool during the day and  chilly  during the night and temperatures dip below  very often. Rainfall is average with sometimes hail, sleet and rarely snow takes place.

Köppen-Geiger climate classification system classifies its climate as hot semi-arid (BSh).

Rafah, Alexandria, Abu Qir, Rosetta, Baltim, Kafr el-Dawwar and Mersa Matruh are the wettest places in Egypt.

See also

 List of cities and towns in Egypt
Rafah
Rafah Border Crossing
Gaza Strip smuggling tunnels

References

Populated places in North Sinai Governorate
Populated coastal places in Egypt
Cities in Egypt
Divided cities